KSLN may refer to:

 KSLN-LP, a low-power radio station (95.9 FM) licensed to serve Sullivan, Missouri, United States
 Salina Regional Airport (ICAO code KSLN)